The 1993 Giro di Lombardia was the 87th edition of the Giro di Lombardia cycle race and was held on 9 October 1993. The race started and finished in Monza. The race was won by Pascal Richard of the Ariostea team.

General classification

References

1993
Giro di Lombardia
Giro di Lombardia
Giro Di Lombardia
October 1993 sports events in Europe